Cayuga Inlet is a river located in Tompkins County, New York. It flows into the south end of Cayuga Lake by Ithaca, New York.

Development
Cayuga Inlet is a popular and well-connected location for boating. Boaters are able to travel from Cayuga Inlet via the Erie Canal and Saint Lawrence Seaway to the Atlantic Ocean, or follow Lake Erie to the Mississippi River and the Gulf of Mexico. Because of this, waterfront property values are high.

The area surrounding Cayuga Inlet includes:
 347 acres of parkland and open space
 Six restaurants and bars
 A spa and health club
 Four facilities which cater to nonmotorized boating (Cornell and Ithaca College crew facilities, a kayak rental business, and Cascadilla Boat Club)
 Ithaca Farmers Market
 Ithaca Dragonboat Club
 Allan H. Treman Marine State park
 Festivals and events such as Water Music and Rhiner Festival

Recreational uses
Cass Park is located along Cayuga Inlet. The Cayuga Waterfront Trail is a 5.5 mile multi-use trail which runs through Cass Park along the banks of Cayuga Inlet. The trail connects joggers and cyclists to Stewart Park, the Farmer's Market, Newman Golf Course, and other destinations in the area.

Cornell University's Collyer Boathouse is located on the east bank of the Cayuga Inlet, just north of where Six Mile Creek drains into the inlet.

Ithaca College's Haskell Davidson Boathouse was built on Cayuga Inlet in 1974 and housed 16 rowers and two boats. As the college grew, a new boathouse was needed. The Davidson Boathouse was razed in September 2011, and the new Robert B. Tallman Rowing Center was dedicated on November 3, 2012.

Ecology
Hydrilla verticillata, a highly invasive species also known as water thyme, was detected in the Cayuga Inlet in August 2011. It had not been found in Cayuga Lake. A project began in 2012-2013 to eradicate hydrilla from the inlet.

References

Rivers of New York (state)
Rivers of Tompkins County, New York